State Route 259 (SR 259) is an approximately  route serving as a connection between SR 9 at Equality with SR 22 in southwest Alexander City.

Route description
The southern terminus of the route is at its intersection with SR 9 in Equality. From this point, the route take a northeasterly course to its northern terminus located at SR 22 in southwest Alexander City.

Major intersections

References

259
Transportation in Coosa County, Alabama
Transportation in Tallapoosa County, Alabama
Alexander City micropolitan area